Dr. Roland Burton is a fictional character from the Lifetime TV show Army Wives. He is played by Sterling K. Brown.

Fictional biography
Roland is married to Colonel Joan Burton (Wendy Davis). As such, he is the lone "Army husband" among the main characters, which include four Army wives.  While he and Joan are at odds in Season 1, he has a one-night stand with a visiting reporter.  He confesses to Joan when she returns from a PTSD treatment center, leading to some anger-filled moments, but she forgives him after a few episodes.

Roland and Joan have a daughter, Sara Elizabeth, who is born at the end of Season 2 and celebrates her first birthday in Season 4.  Sara Elizabeth's godparents are Claudia Joy and Lieutenant General Michael Holden.

In Season 5, Roland and Joan adopt an 11-year-old boy named David, even after learning that the boy is HIV-positive.

Career
In the first season, Roland is a civilian psychiatrist specializing in Post Traumatic Stress Disorder, working in an army hospital. He is also the author of several medical books.  As an Army spouse, he is dealing with the on and off deployments of his wife, who is a lieutenant colonel in the Army and leads a combat unit in Afghanistan.

In Season 2, Joan returns home to work for General Holden, while Roland puts his previous education and experience in psychiatry to use as a counselor/teacher for the high school at Fort Marshall.  He briefly loses that job due to what are quickly revealed to be unfair circumstances, and is reinstated at the high school.

When he and his wife separate pending a divorce, he accepts a job as a psychiatrist in another state. Just before his planned departure, he and his wife reconcile. He begins working night shifts at the Fort Marshall post hospital. Through a mutual patient he meets a local civilian psychologist named Terence Price, who has a clinic in town. As a psychologist, Price is unable to write prescriptions, and the psychiatrist he had been working with had retired. Price offers Roland a job part-time  at his clinic, including child care for the Burtons' new baby. The clinic treats both local civilians and soldiers from the post who want private counseling to avoid letting their superiors know about their problems. Demand is great, and Roland's role, and hours, quickly increase until he is a full-time partner in the clinic.

Late Season 3, Terence Price is forced to flee due to an incident in the past (which caused him to change his identity), and Roland assumes the practice himself.  Joan, meanwhile, has been promoted to colonel, and deploys to Iraq late in Season 3. Roland is forced to juggle career and home life, much as the Army wives are doing, as the couple's daughter turns one year old.

Roland still has privileges at the post hospital, and in Season 4 one of his on-post patients is Jeremy Sherwood. Jeremy is suffering from survivor's guilt after seeing one of his friends killed in Iraq.

In Season 6, Roland is convinced by Charlie, a leader at the Fort Marshall Youth Center, to volunteer some time as a group counselor for at-risk teens.

External links
 Roland Burton at Lifetime

Army Wives characters
Television characters introduced in 2007
Fictional psychiatrists
Fictional African-American people